Hamidah or Hamida is the female version of the Arabic name Hamid. It may refer to:

Places 
Hamidah, Yemen, a village in Yemen

People 
Fatimah Hasan Delais (1915-1953), an Indonesian novelist who wrote under the pen name Hamidah
Wanda Hamidah (1977-), an Indonesian politician and activist
Hamida Nana (1946-), a Syrian writer